Aksaklar can refer to:

 Aksaklar, Göynük
 Aksaklar, Yığılca